Khyber Teaching Hospital (abbreviated as KTH), is a university hospital and the primary teaching affiliate of Khyber Medical College, Peshawar, Pakistan. 

KTH lies on the historic route that links up to the historic Khyber Pass. This is one of the largest hospitals in the country. As a tertiary health-care facility, KTH serves as major referral center in the region. This facility serves a large population, both domestic and foreign, in the north west region of Pakistan as well as in north eastern Afghanistan. This more than 1800 bedded hospital has most of the major and minor medical and surgical departments.

History
Khyber Teaching Hospital, formerly Hayat Shaheed Teaching Hospital, was established in 1976 as a training and biomedical research facility for the medical students of the north western region of Pakistan, as well as the new teaching affiliate of the best medical school in the region, Khyber Medical College. Khyber Teaching Hospital has developed into a major health care facility in the region.

The hospital was commissioned in 1976 for the development of scientific and research base of the Province. It is an architectural marvel shaped in an octagon with extensions of Y shaped wings that form a wide number of its inpatient units. The present capacity of beds is 1202, with incremental increases every few years. As of September 2013, a major revamp and reconstruction of its emergency facilities is underway with a multi-storeyed building for the proposed Emergency Department and Emergency Medicine Fellowship Program. To facilitate smooth influx and patient transport, recently constructed under ground passage and the over-head bridge have made safer the smooth flow of patients and students between KMC, Institute of Radiotherapy and Nuclear Medicine (IRNUM) and KTH. From 1976 to 2000, constant up-gradations have taken place within the developmental phases of the 3 tertiary care hospitals of the city. As a result,  these institutions have been transformed into more effective, viable and productive institutions benefiting patients, undergraduate and postgraduate trainees and are playing major role in the human resource development in the health sector for the region.

Khyber Medical College, the first medical school of the province,  came into existence in February, 1954. Fulfillment of the Pakistan Medical Commission (Former Pakistan Medical and Dental Council) requirements necessitated the creation of a Teaching Hospital. Initially Lady Reading Hospital Peshawar, the  then district headquarters hospital, was utilized for the purpose. But sooner the need was felt to have a teaching hospital in close proximity to the college. Plan for such a hospital was initiated in 1958 and the idea finally materialized, when General Mohammad Musa, the Governor West Pakistan, laid the foundation stone of Khyber Teaching Hospital (at that time named as Ayub Teaching Hospital) on 30 November 1967.

Khyber Medical College, an undergraduate institution, has been improving the quality of service provided to the patients. Through its various teaching departments it has upgraded the quality service program. The provincial assembly of Khyber Pakhtunkhwa has passed the act for upgradation of Khyber Medical College and Khyber College of Dentistry to Khyber Medical University (KMU) Peshawar.

Khyber College of Dentistry as department of Dentistry was created in 1964. It was upgraded from the status of a department of Khyber Medical College in 1990. Dr. Ahmad Iqbal was appointed as first Chairman and Principal of the Khyber College of Dentistry. The first batch graduated in 1968 and Pakistan medical and dental council accorded recognition to B.D.S degree in Nov 1968. From the modest start it has grown to become a fully developed teaching institute with its modern Oral and Dental hospital. Surgeries, Operation theater and wards were included in its building over time.

School of Nursing Khyber Teaching Hospital also works as an allied institution with KTH for training of student nurses since inception of the institution.

The examination and award of degree for Khyber Medical College, Khyber College of Dentistry, B.Sc Nursing is performed by University of Peshawar, whereas for Nursing School, the job is done by the Board of Nursing, Peshawar.

Management Council (MC)
MC, formerly IMC (Institutional Management Committee), is a constituent body of the institution. The institution includes three major components:
 Khyber Teaching Hospital, Peshawar
 Khyber Medical College, Peshawar
 Khyber College of Dentistry of Peshawar

MC members
 Hospital Director  (Formerly called as Chief Executive)
 Principal, Khyber Medical College, Peshawar (Member) 
 Principal, Khyber College of Dentistry, Peshawar (Member)
 Medical Superintendent, Khyber Teaching Hospital, Peshawar (Secretary)
 Director Finance, KTH, KMC, KCD, Peshawar (Member)
 Three Ex-Offico Members( Ex-officio & Public representatives)

See also
 Lady Reading Hospital Peshawar
 Hayatabad Medical Complex Peshawar
 Ayub Teaching Hospital
 Saidu Teaching Hospital

References

External links
Khyber Teaching Hospital - official website

Hospital buildings completed in 1954
Hospitals in Peshawar
Hospitals established in 1976
1976 establishments in Pakistan
Teaching hospitals in Pakistan